Klubi Futbollistik Shqiponja Pejë is a professional football club from Kosovo which competes in the Third League (Group B). The club is based in Peć, Kosovo. The club was founded in 1999.

Notes and references

Notes

References

Shqiponja
Shqiponja
Sport in Peja
1999 establishments in Kosovo